Campo Grande is the largest neighborhood in the West Zone of Rio de Janeiro. Campo Grande has a population of 328,370 inhabitants and an area of 119,1253 sq km (46 sq mi), on both counts Rio's largest. It is situated 50 kilometers (31 miles) away from Downtown Rio.

History 

Campo Grande, which in the early 1940s was considered the "Empire of the Orange", grew along with the settlement of Brazil. The valley, which begins in the Rio da Prata and ends in Cabuçu, was inhabited by Picinguabas and granted by the Portuguese Crown to Barcelos Domingos. In 1673, Domingos built the chapel of Our Lady of the Exile, which later became the parish church of Campo Grande. Near the church was a well also called Our Lady of the Exile, which provided water to the local population.

The region began to grow in 1878 with the inauguration of the Campo Grande railway station, connected to the Estrada de Ferro Central do Brasil (Brazilian Central Railway). It became easier to reach the center of the city quickly, and the region began to develop at a rapid pace.

On October 16, 1895, Campo Grande began tram service. On that day, the Municipal Council gave a concession to a private company, the Companhia de Carros Urbanos (Urban Streetcar Company), to install a line using animal power. The goal was to provide transportation to the railway.

In 1915, the company proposed to the Prefecture of the Federal District the substitution of animal power with 48 km of electrified lines, whose trams would leave from the center of Campo Grande for Pedra de Guaratiba, Ilha, and Rio da Prata. The line remained in service until October 30, 1967, when trams were removed from Campo Grande.

Campo Grande went from being an essentially rural area to an urban one. Next to Realengo, Jacarepaguá, and Santa Cruz, until 1939 Campo Grande was one of the largest producers of oranges, exporting up to 144,577 tons each year.

Development 

The city fabric of Campo Grande is regular and discontinuous, the habitation of the area consisting in isolated lots of large areas. Owing to the large network of services and a growing level of commerce, Campo Grande grew at an extraordinary pace.

High levels of homeownership are found in Campo Grande. Three-bedroom houses are most common, with an area of 120 square meters. In 1962 and 1979, CEHAB built the Conjunto Santa Margarida on the Estrada do Campinho.

In terms of education, Campo Grande has one of the largest concentrations of students in the Rio de Janeiro (state). The rate of school attendance is satisfactory, as is the rate of enrollment, which has increased yearly.

The Miécimo da Silva Sports Complex, in which sports training is provided to the population in Campo Grande, hosts major international events such as the 2007 Pan American Games.

City of Campo Grande 

On June 14, 1968, the locality was officially designated a city under Law #1627, advanced by the deputy Frederico Trotta, though it remained part of the city and municipality of Rio de Janeiro.

Industry and commerce 

Commerce in the neighborhood is self-sufficient, attracting business from other regions. Campo Grande has two shopping malls, West Shopping and the ParkShopping Campo Grande, which is planning to be the biggest in South America. The industrial sector is also growing. Campo Grande has an Industrial District on km. 43 of the Avenida Brasil, reaching the Estrada do Pedregoso.

In 1946, Bartolomeu Rabelo founded an aviary that was the birthplace of carioca bird farming, which today has attained a high level of development.

Some of the companies found in Campo Grande include AmBev, Refrigerantes Convenção, Guaracamp, Cogumelo (metallurgy), Fredvic (heating), Novartis (pharmaceuticals), Sacipan (café Câmara), Michelin, EBSE (electrical fuses), Superpesa (metallurgy), Dancor (munitions) and Ranbaxy (pharmaceuticals).

In Rio da Prata, Mendanha, and Guaratiba, one can still find agriculture and livestock. Among the most common crops are bananas, oranges, mangoes, pears, cassava root, and chayotes. In terms of birds and livestock, one can find goat antelopes, pigs, cow, and rabbit. Campo Grande remains one of the most industrialized suburbs of Rio de Janeiro. Campo grande is a great place to conduct business because population is increasing over the years.

Sub-neighborhoods of Campo Grande 
Adriana (in Portuguese)
Alessandra
Amanda
Amazonas
Andréa
Araújo
Arnaldo Eugênio
Benjamim do Monte
BNH
Carina
Caroba
Carobinha
Carolina
Comari
Corcundinha
Cosmos
Débora
Inhoaíba
Isadora
Jardim da Luz (in Portuguese)
Jardim Letícia
Jardim Nova Guaratiba
Jardim Paulista
Jardim Terra Firme
Joari
Magali
Manguariba
Manuela
Mendanha
Monteiro
Morada
Morada do Campo
Moriçaba
Novo Campo Grande
Oiticica
Padre Belisário
Pedra Angular
Pedregoso
Rio da Prata
Rozendo (in Portuguese)
Santa Cecília
Santa Rosa
Santa Margarida
Santíssimo 
Santo Antônio
São Geraldo
São Basílio
São Cláudio
São Pedro
São Jorge
São Vítor 
Senador Vasconcelos
Souza
Tingüi
Vila Adelaide
Vila Eunice
Vila Izete
Vila Jardim
Vila Mariana
Vila Nova
Vila Santa Rita
Vila São João
Vilar Carioca

External links
Portal Campo Grande (Portuguese)
Official radio station of Campo Grande (Portuguese)
Lions Club of Campo Grande (Portuguese)

Neighbourhoods in Rio de Janeiro (city)